Ruineniaceae is a family of fungi in the order Agaricostilbales. The family contains a single genus. Species are known only from their yeast states.

References

Basidiomycota families
Agaricostilbales
Monogeneric fungus families